Prosopocera bicolor is a species of beetle in the family Cerambycidae. It was described by Westwood in 1845, originally under the genus Lamia. It is known from Ghana and Cameroon.

References

Prosopocerini
Beetles described in 1845